Concana is a genus of moths of the family Noctuidae. The genus was erected by Francis Walker in 1858.

Species
 Concana intricata Schaus, 1911 Costa Rica
 Concana lecta Schaus, 1911 Costa Rica
 Concana mundissima Walker, [1858] Florida, Antilles to Brazil
 Concana permixta Schaus, 1912 Costa Rica

References

Calpinae
Noctuoidea genera